Dannemora is a suburb in Auckland, New Zealand. It is located in the east of the city, close to Pakuranga and Botany Downs, and in the Howick ward and local board area of Auckland Council.

Demographics

Dannemora had a population of 9,678 at the 2018 New Zealand census, an increase of 333 people (3.6%) since the 2013 census, and an increase of 258 people (2.7%) since the 2006 census. There were 2,910 households, comprising 4,743 males and 4,932 females, giving a sex ratio of 0.96 males per female, with 1,785 people (18.4%) aged under 15 years, 2,064 (21.3%) aged 15 to 29, 4,752 (49.1%) aged 30 to 64, and 1,080 (11.2%) aged 65 or older.

Ethnicities were 34.6% European/Pākehā, 4.2% Māori, 4.4% Pacific peoples, 56.2% Asian, and 7.3% other ethnicities. People may identify with more than one ethnicity.

The percentage of people born overseas was 59.9, compared with 27.1% nationally.

Although some people chose not to answer the census's question about religious affiliation, 39.4% had no religion, 33.5% were Christian, 0.2% had Māori religious beliefs, 8.8% were Hindu, 4.8% were Muslim, 4.1% were Buddhist and 4.2% had other religions.

Of those at least 15 years old, 2,496 (31.6%) people had a bachelor's or higher degree, and 864 (10.9%) people had no formal qualifications. 1,629 people (20.6%) earned over $70,000 compared to 17.2% nationally. The employment status of those at least 15 was that 4,092 (51.8%) people were employed full-time, 1,074 (13.6%) were part-time, and 270 (3.4%) were unemployed.

Education
The school opened in 2004.

It opened in 2001 and was named for the oldest remaining house in the area, Willowbank Cottage, which was once used as a school.

Both these schools are coeducational. Rolls are as of

References

Suburbs of Auckland
Howick Local Board Area